This article lists the winners and nominees for the Black Reel Award for Outstanding Production Design. The award is given to the production designer of the nominated film. The category was first introduced at the 19th Annual Black Reel Awards where Hannah Beachler took home the first award in this category for Black Panther.

Winners and nominees

2010s

2020s

Multiple nominations and wins

References

Black Reel Awards